Pa (Patrick) Sheehy is an Irish singer-songwriter from Dingle County Kerry.

Sheehy achieved some chart success in his native Ireland and across Europe as the lead singer of Walking on Cars. Since the 2020 break up of the band, Sheehy began releasing solo material. His debut single, "Saw You at a Funeral", was released in June 2021 with a follow-up single, titled "Roisin", released in August 2021. His debut EP, The Art of Disappearing, was released in September 2021, charting at number 9 in the Irish Albums Chart on the week of its launch.

Discography

EPs
 The Art of Disappearing (2021) – reached No. 9 Irish Albums Chart (1 week)

Singles
 "Saw You at a Funeral" (2021)
 "Róisín" (2021)

References

Irish male singer-songwriters
Living people
Year of birth missing (living people)
Place of birth missing (living people)
Musicians from County Kerry
People from Dingle